Ferdinand Manuel Martin Louis Barthélemy de Craywinckel (24 August 1820 – fl. 1888) was a conductor and composer. He studied at the Conservatoire de Bordeaux with Bellon. He was maitre de chapelle at St. Bruno, where he lived after 1825. He wrote many masses and other church works which are of high calibre.

References

French conductors (music)
French male conductors (music)
French composers
French male composers
1820 births
Year of death missing